This is a list of the first women lawyer(s) and judge(s) in Iowa. It includes the year in which the women were admitted to practice law (in parentheses). Also included are women who achieved other distinctions such becoming the first in their state to graduate from law school or become a political figure.

Firsts in Iowa's history

Lawyers 

First female: Arabella Mansfield (1869) 
First female (actively practice): Judith Ellen Foster: (1872) 
First African American female: Gertrude Rush (1918)  
First African American female to argue before Iowa Supreme Court: Ashley Stewart (2018)

State judges 

 First female: Lynne Brady Neuhaus from 1973-2002  
 First female (Iowa Court of Appeals): Janet Johnson from 1978-1983  
 First female (Iowa Supreme Court): Linda K. Neuman from 1986-2003  
First female (Chief Justice; Iowa Supreme Court): Marsha K. Ternus in 2006 
First African American female: Romonda Belcher-Ford (1995) in 2010

Federal judges 
First female (Seventh Judicial District): Margaret Briles from 1977-1992 
First female (serve on the bench of either of Iowa's federal district courts): Celeste F. Bremer (1977)
First female (Fifth Judicial District): Linda R. Reade (1980) from 1993-2002  
 First female (Chief Judge; Seventh Judicial District): Bobbi M. Alpers (1983) in 2006 
First female (U.S. District Court for the Southern District of Iowa and confirmed as an Article III judge): Stephanie Marie Rose (1996) beginning in 2012

Attorney General of Iowa 

First female: Bonnie Campbell (1985) from 1991-1995

Assistant United States Attorney

 First African American (female) (Northern District of Iowa): Stephanie Wright

County Attorney

 First female: Emily L. Newbold in 1923

Iowa State Bar Association 

 First female president: Carroll J. Reasoner

Firsts in local history

 Nancy Whittenburg: First female appointed as a district county judge in District 3A of Iowa (2003)
 Mary Sokolovske: First female appointed as a district county judge in District 3B of Iowa (2000)
 Dusti Relph (2005): First female appointed as a Judge of Iowa District Court 5B (2014)
 Adria Kester: First female appointed as a Judge of Iowa District Court 2B (2017)
 Rosemary Shaw Sackett (1963): First  female to practice law in Spencer, Iowa. She would later become a judge. [Clay County, Iowa]
 Margaret Kolarik (1925): First female lawyer in Clinton, Iowa [Clinton County, Iowa]
 Virginia Bedell: First female to serve as the County Attorney for Dickinson County, Iowa (1938)
 Mary B. Hickey Wilkinson: First female to graduate from the University of Iowa College of Law (1873) [Johnson County, Iowa]
 Anna Harvat Holbert (1899): First female lawyer in Iowa City, Iowa [Johnson County, Iowa]
 Ann Gales: First female district associate judge in Kossuth County, Iowa (2014)
 Imogen B. Emery (1933): First female lawyer in Cedar Rapids, Iowa [Linn County, Iowa]
 Willie Stevenson Glanton: First female (and African American female) to become an Assistant Polk County Attorney
 Linda K. Neuman: First female to serve as a part-time magistrate in Scott County, Iowa (c. 1980)
 Ruth Harkin: First female to serve as the County Attorney for Story County, Iowa
 Emily L. Newbold: First female to serve as a County Attorney in Van Buren County, Iowa (1923)
 Sherry Raduenz: First female lawyer in Decorah, Iowa [Winneshiek County, Iowa]

See also  

 List of first women lawyers and judges in the United States
 Timeline of women lawyers in the United States
 Women in law

Other topics of interest 

 List of first minority male lawyers and judges in the United States
 List of first minority male lawyers and judges in Iowa

References 

Lawyers, Iowa, first
Iowa, first
Women, Iowa, first
Women, Iowa, first
Women in Iowa
Lists of people from Iowa
Iowa lawyers